In geometry, the triangular cupola is one of the Johnson solids. It can be seen as half a cuboctahedron.

Formulae
The following formulae for the volume,  the surface area and the height can be used if all faces are regular, with edge length a:

Dual polyhedron 

The dual of the triangular cupola has 6 triangular and 3 kite faces:

Related polyhedra and honeycombs

The triangular cupola can be augmented by 3 square pyramids, leaving adjacent coplanar faces. This isn't a Johnson solid because of its coplanar faces. Merging those coplanar triangles into larger ones, topologically this is another triangular cupola with isosceles trapezoidal side faces. If all the triangles are retained and the base hexagon is replaced by 6 triangles, it generates a coplanar deltahedron with 22 faces.

The triangular cupola can form a tessellation of space with square pyramids and/or octahedra, the same way octahedra and cuboctahedra can fill space.

The family of cupolae with regular polygons exists up to n=5 (pentagons), and higher if isosceles triangles are used in the cupolae.

References

External links
 

Prismatoid polyhedra
Johnson solids